Melissa Williams may refer to:
 Melissa Williams (academic), American academic who specialises in democratic theory and comparative political theory
 Melissa L. Williams, American actress and model
 Melissa Williams (skateboarder), South African skateboarder